Paradox of the Actor, written between 1770 and 1778 but first published after the death of the author in 1830, is a dramatic essay by Denis Diderot elucidating a theory of acting in which it is argued that great actors do not experience the emotions they are displaying.

Content
The essay consists of a dialogue between two speakers in which the first speaker espouses the views of Diderot on acting. The first speaker argues that the great actor is characterized by a complete absence of any feeling; and that the art of the great actor consists of displaying the illusion of feeling. The reason is that if the great actor were to become emotional he would not be able to play the same part in the theater in repeat performances with the same success. Also, those actors who depend on feeling when performing usually give unpredictable or uneven performances. The great actor is thus guided by his intelligence, and not by his emotion. Once the great actor has studied and conceptualized his part through intelligence, he will be able to give repeat performances successfully irrespective of what is going on in his personal life.

Occasionally, the character being played, as conceptualized by the great actor, transcends the character conceptualized by the author. Diderot gives the example of Mlle. Clairon, who once played a character in a play authored by Voltaire; Voltaire, who was in the audience, had cried out "Did I write that?" on seeing her magnificent performance. Diderot accepts that a great actor like Mlle. Clairon could experience emotion when portraying the character for the first time; but in repeat performances she would be in complete control of her emotions. Diderot also gives an example of the great actor's theatrical discipline: 

The essay is also of note for being where the term l'esprit de l'escalier
(or l'esprit d'escalier) comes from. It is a French term used in English for the predicament of thinking of the perfect reply too late. As noted in the essay, during a dinner at the home of statesman Jacques Necker, a remark was made to Diderot which left him speechless at the time, because, he explains, "a sensitive man, such as myself, overwhelmed by the argument levelled against him, becomes confused and [can only think clearly again when he] finds himself at the bottom of the stairs" ("")

To have reached the bottom of the stairs means to have definitively left the gathering.

Appreciation
Lee Strasberg commented that Diderot's analysis in Paradox of the Actor "has remained to this day the most significant attempt to deal with the problem of acting."

In the early 20th century, the influential stage director Theodore Komisarjevsky was quoted as criticizing Diderot's view that a good actor should "watch himself" during the performance, as his experience suggested that this led to an unhelpful self-consciousness. He agreed that an actor should not directly experience the emotions being portrayed, but recommended that they imaginatively engage with the creative setting, rather than intellectually focus on their own performance.

References

Notes

Denis Diderot
1830 essays